RK Đakovo is a team handball club from Đakovo, Croatia. It was established in 1954.

Notable players 

  Domagoj Duvnjak
  Marko Kopljar

References

External links 
 Official website 

Djakovo
Sport in Đakovo